Peggy Antoinette Vidot (born 1958–59) is a Seychellois nurse and midwife. Since 3 November 2020, she serves as the Minister of Health.

Biography
Vidot is a registered midwife from the Luton and Dunstable School of Midwifery, and a registered nurse from the Bath School of Nursing. She graduated with a master's degree in health services management from the University of Manchester.

In 1977, she started her career as a nurse instructor at the School of Nursing in Seychelles. In 2003, she was appointed Health Advisor for the Commonwealth Secretariat in London. Upon her return to Seychelles in 2012, she was appointed Special Advisor to the Minister for Health, and served until 2016.

Vidot is the chairperson of the National Aids Council in Seychelles, and was a proponent of switching HIV treatment tasks from doctors to nurses and midwives to better combat the disease in Africa. In order to enable the switching, she initiated the African Health Profession Regulatory Collaborative (ARC) together with Patricia Riley of the CDC, as a framework to strengthen nursing and midwifery education. In 2011, ARC was established and has been implemented in 17 nations as of 2016.

On 29 October 2020, Vidot was elected Minister of Health, succeeding Jean-Paul Adam.

References

1950s births
Living people
Government ministers of Seychelles
Women government ministers of Seychelles
Alumni of the University of Manchester
Seychellois nurses
Seychellois midwives